"Use ta Be My Girl" is a song by R&B vocal group The O'Jays. Released from their hit 1978 album, So Full of Love, it became a huge crossover hit. The song spent five weeks at number one on the R&B singles chart. It also peaked at number four on the Billboard Hot 100 singles chart. "Use ta Be My Girl" became one of the biggest and most familiar hits by The O'Jays. The song has also been certified by the RIAA as a Million-Seller.

Chart performance

Weekly charts

Year-end charts

References

External links
[ Song review] on Allmusic
 

1978 singles
The O'Jays songs
Songs written by Kenny Gamble
Songs written by Leon Huff
1978 songs
Philadelphia International Records singles
Torch songs